Brookesia tedi is a species of chameleon. It is found in Madagascar.

References

Brookesia
Reptiles of Madagascar
Reptiles described in 2019
Taxa named by Mark D. Scherz
Taxa named by Jörn Köhler
Taxa named by Andolalao Rakotoarison
Taxa named by Frank Glaw
Taxa named by Miguel Vences